Does Humor Belong in Music? is a live album by Frank Zappa.

Releases 
The only authorized (by Zappa) EMI CD features concert recordings from October–December 1984. It was the first album by Zappa to be released on CD only (although it was bootlegged on vinyl for listeners who did not own CD players). In 1995, it was reissued by Rykodisc in an extremely remixed form, with significantly improved dynamic range and new artwork. The 1995 edition includes an extra minute of percussion effects during "Let's Move to Cleveland" that had been excised from the EMI edition. In 2012 the (remixed) album was reissued as a part the Zappa Reissue Program. It was a part of "The 4th set of 12" released on October 30, 2012 and featured the original artwork without the white stain in the bottom left.

A home video (later reissued on DVD) of the same name was released. "Zoot Allures", "Tinsel Town Rebellion", "Trouble Every Day" and "Whipping Post" appear on both, but are different performances. Fragments of "Hot-Plate Heaven" also appear in the video (with only the verses of the song left intact). The cover art of the original CD release and video release, however, are the same.

Track listing 
All tracks by Frank Zappa except as noted.

Personnel 
 Frank Zappa – lead guitar, vocals
 Ray White – rhythm guitar, vocals
 Ike Willis – rhythm guitar, vocal
 Bobby Martin – keyboards, saxophone, vocal, french horn
 Allan Zavod – keyboards, solo on "Cleveland"
 Scott Thunes –  bass guitar
 Chad Wackerman – drums, solo on "Cleveland"
 Dweezil Zappa – lead guitar on "Whipping Post"

Production
Frank Zappa - producer, arranger
Mark Pinske - recording engineer
Thom Ehle - recording engineer
Bob Stone - remix engineer
Ebet Roberts - cover photography
Mark Matsuno - design
Cal Schenkel - cover for 1995 CD

Notes 

1986 live albums
EMI Records live albums
Frank Zappa live albums